Naked over the Fence (Original title: Naakt over de schutting) is a 1973 Dutch film by Frans Weisz starring Sylvia Kristel.

It was released in France in 1977 and recorded admissions of 15,981.

References

External links 
 

1973 films
Dutch thriller films